Massive Entertainment AB is a Swedish video game developer and a studio of Ubisoft based in Malmö. The company has been fully owned by Ubisoft since 2008. The studio is known for Tom Clancy's The Division, The Division 2, Ground Control, and World in Conflict.

History
Massive Entertainment was founded in 1997 by Martin Walfisz. In June 2000, Massive released the award-winning PC action-strategy title Ground Control, published by Sierra Studios. The same year an expansion was released named Ground Control: Dark Conspiracy.

In 2002, the studio was acquired by Vivendi Universal Games through their NDA Productions subsidiary. In October 2007, they released the game World in Conflict, described as a further development of the real-time tactics gameplay formula from the Ground Control games, but set on Earth during an alternate history late Cold War. The game was released on 18 September 2007 and won critical acclaim, including nominations for one of the best games of 2007. It was followed by an expansion, World in Conflict: Soviet Assault. In December 2007, the studio moved into new offices on Drottninggatan in Malmö, employing 130 people at the time.

On 6 August 2008, Activision Blizzard put up Massive Entertainment for sale after the merger of Activision and Vivendi Games and the subsequent internal reorganization. On 10 November 2008, Ubisoft acquired Massive Entertainment. In March 2009, following the acquisition, the former CEO Martin Walfisz left the company.

In December 2010, Ubisoft confirmed that Massive would be working on an Assassin's Creed project. On 5 May 2011, it was announced that Massive Entertainment was collaborating on development of Assassin's Creed: Revelations, developing the Desmond's journey sequences in the game, which was released in November 2011. Massive also collaborated on the development of Far Cry 3, which was released in December 2012.

At E3 2013 Massive announced their next game, Tom Clancy's The Division. The game was released on 8 March 2016 and sold more copies in its first 24 hours than any game in Ubisoft's history, the biggest first week for a new game franchise, generating $330 million in its first five days.

In March 2017, Massive announced that their next major title would be based on James Cameron's Avatar. The game was revealed at E3 2021 to be titled Avatar: Frontiers of Pandora and is set for a release in 2022. In April 2020, Massive and its more than 650 staff moved from the offices on Drottninggatan to Kvarteret Eden, a former textile factory in Malmö's Möllevången district.

In January 2021, the newly reformed Lucasfilm Games announced that Massive started work on a new Star Wars open world title. This would be the first Star Wars game outside of Electronic Arts since they acquired a May 2013 contract to produce all Star Wars related titles.

Games developed

References

External links
 

Ubisoft divisions and subsidiaries
Former Activision subsidiaries
Companies based in Malmö
Video game companies of Sweden
Video game development companies
Video game companies established in 1997
Swedish companies established in 1997
2008 mergers and acquisitions